Nizhny Ubekimakhi (Dargwa: УбяхӀ Убекимахьи) is a rural locality (a selo) in Khadzhalmakhinsky Selsoviet, Levashinsky District, Republic of Dagestan, Russia. The population was 802 as of 2010.

Geography 
Nizhny Ubekimakhi is located 19 km southwest of Levashi (the district's administrative centre) by road. Tashkapur and Chagni are the nearest rural localities.

Nationalities 
Dargins live there.

References 

Rural localities in Levashinsky District